Area 25 is the largest named area in the Nevada National Security Site at , and has its own direct access from Route 95. Area 25 is commonly called "Jackass Flats" because it is composed primarily of a shallow alluvial basin by that name.

It was originally known as "Area 400", and was renamed "Area 25" circa 1970.

No nuclear explosions took place within Area 25.

History

Area 25 is the site of the now decommissioned Nuclear Rocket Development Station (NRDS). It was built in support of Project Rover to test prototype nuclear rocket engines. The complex includes three test stands, the Engine Maintenance, Assembly, and Disassembly (E-MAD) facility, the Reactor Maintenance, Assembly, and Disassembly (R-MAD) facility, a control point/technical operations complex, an administrative area and a radioactive material storage area. The R-MAD Facility was built to support the nuclear rocket program and was operational from 1959 through 1970. It was used to assemble reactor engines and to disassemble and study reactor parts and fuel elements after reactor tests. Project Rover was successful, but ultimately canceled. On 8 December 1962, President John F. Kennedy visited the NRDS.

Jackass Flats was proposed as a possible launch site for Project Orion, administered by General Atomics in the late 1950s.

The Rock Valley Study Area, at the southern boundary of Area 25, was used for studies of radiation in a desert ecosystem, starting in 1960.

High-level radioactive materials handling studies were carried out at the BREN Tower, recently demolished by implosion in Jackass Flats, where it was moved after 1963 for the High Energy Neutron Reaction Experiment (HENRE) series.

A "Treatability Test Facility" was established in Area 25 to study the physics of decontaminating soil containing plutonium or uranium.

Area 25 was used in the early 1980s for Peacekeeper missile siting studies and canister ejection certification tests.

Air Force Lieutenant General Robert M. Bond was test flying a MiG-23 from the secret U.S. fleet of MiGs held at Area 51. He lost control of the MiG 23 over Area 25 on his second orientation flight on April 26, 1984. To explain the death and conceal the nuclear rocket testing that occurred at Area 25, the information on the crash and the secret MiG testing program, with no mention of the prior use of the crash area, was leaked to Fred Hoffman, an AP military reporter.

Yucca Mountain nuclear waste repository site characterization studies were conducted at the site of earlier NRDS work. Yucca Mountain extends into Area 25, which was the proposed access point for delivery of radioactive waste to the repository.

Current activities

Portions of Area 25 are used by the military for training exercises. The U.S. Army Ballistic Research Laboratory conducts open-air and X-tunnel tests using depleted uranium.

On July 8, 2010, Harry Reid, Steven Chu and Ken Salazar announced that a  portion of this area was being reassigned as a development and test area for new solar technologies.
 
One of the test stands of Area 25, the Reactor Maintenance, Assembly, and Disassembly (R-MAD) facility, has been demolished. The non-radiologically contaminated portions of the facility were demolished in late 2005. Demolition activities for the radiologically contaminated portions of the R-MAD Facility were initiated in October 2009 and completed on
July 15, 2010.

References

External links 

 Nevada Test Site at fas.org
 Nevada Test Site Areas 25-30 at globalsecurity.org
MX Missile Trench Breakout Test in Area 25

Nevada Test Site